Panulirus marginatus, the Hawaiian spiny lobster, is a species of spiny lobster in the family Palinuridae which is endemic to the Hawaiian Islands. It is the subject of extensive commercial and recreational fisheries.

It is known as ʻula in Hawaiian.

Description 

The species can reach a total body length of about 40 cm with their carapace length reaching about 12 cm. They have an exoskeleton that encases them and protects them from predators. This exoskeleton is molted periodically as the lobster grows and ages. Shortly after molting the lobsters are in a more vulnerable state and therefore go deep into their hiding so that they can be safer until their carapace hardens once again. Spiny Lobsters do not have the large claws like some other lobster species.

Distribution & habitat 
This species is endemic to the Hawaiian Islands. Ranging from the Hawaiian Islands to the Northwest where the Pearl and Hermes Atoll is. They have also been found around Laysan Island. They are usually found in shallow waters but have been found up to 143m beneath the surface.  They are nocturnal and known to hide in protected spaces under rocks and in crevices.

Human use 
They have always been used as a food source. They are easy to find and catch due to often being found in shallow waters, however they are now a protected species in Hawaii and therefore guarded by specific laws to preserve their population. No Spiny Lobsters may be caught between May-August and no females with eggs may be taken. The minimum legal size to take when all other stipulations have been met is a carapace 3.25 inches in length.

Cultural significance 
The species was historically used in place of pigs during sacrificial offerings to gods.

References

External links
 https://spo.nmfs.noaa.gov/sites/default/files/pdf-content/MFR/mfr552/mfr5525.pdf
 https://www.waikikiaquarium.org/experience/animal-guide/invertebrates/crustaceans/hawaiian-spiny-lobster/
 https://mauioceancenter.com/marine-life/spiny-lobster/
 http://species-identification.org/species.php?species_group=lobsters&menuentry=soorten&id=158&tab=refs
 https://reefguide.org/bandedspinylobster.html

Achelata
Crustaceans of Hawaii
Crustaceans described in 1825
Endemic fauna of Hawaii